The Scottish Rugby Academy provides Scotland's up and coming rugby stars a dedicated focused routeway for development into the professional game. Entry is restricted to Scottish qualified students and both male and female entrants are accepted into 4 regional academies. The 2016–17 season sees the second year of the academy.

Season overview

This was the second year of the Scottish Rugby Academy

Regional Academies

The Scottish Rugby Academy runs four regional academies in Scotland:- Glasgow and the West, Borders and East Lothian, Edinburgh and Caledonia. These roughly correspond to the traditional districts of Glasgow District, South, Edinburgh District and North and Midlands.

Players and Stages

Players are selected in three stages:- Stage 1 - Regionally selected and regionally supported players; Stage 2 - Nationally selected and regionally supported players; and Stage 3 - Nationally selected and regionally supported players assigned to a professional team.

Stage 3 players

Stage 3 players are assigned to a professional team. Nominally, for the men, Glasgow Warriors receive the Stage 3 players of Glasgow and the West and Caledonia regions, while Edinburgh Rugby receive the Stage 3 players of the Edinburgh and Borders and East Lothian regions. The women are integrated into the Scotland women's national rugby sevens team and the Scotland women's national rugby union team.

This season some of the Stage 3 players were additionally loaned out to London Scottish for their development.

Borders and East Lothian

Caledonia

No Stage 3 players selected.

Edinburgh

Glasgow and the West

London Scottish

London Scottish is a SRU member and a professional club playing in the 2016–17 RFU Championship. The SRU has a partnership agreement with London Scottish for a player development pathway. Although these Stage 3 players are nominally assigned to Glasgow Warriors or Edinburgh Rugby these academy players have then been loaned out to the Exiles side for development.

Stage 1 and 2 players

The inductees into the 2016–17 season are split into their regional academies.

Borders and East Lothian

 Patrick Anderson Stage 1/2 Melrose RFC
 Harry Borthwick Stage 1/2 Melrose RFC (Lock)
 Thomas Brown Stage 1/2 Melrose RFC
 Kyle Brunton Stage 1/2 Hawick RFC
 Rory Darge Stage 1/2 North Berwick RFC
 Roan Frostwick Stage 1/2 North Berwick RFC
 Adam Hall Stage 1/2 Melrose RFC
 Andrew Horne Stage 1/2 Preston Lodge RFC (Blindside flanker)
 Robbie McCallum Stage 1/2 Loretto School
 Gary Munro Stage 1/2 Jed-Forest RFC
 Fraser Renwick Stage 1/2 Hawick RFC
 Finlay Scott Stage 1/2 Jed Thistle RFC

Caledonia

 Kaleem Barreto Stage 1/2 Glenalmond College (Scrum-half)
 Fergus Bradbury Stage 1/2 Stirling University
 Callum Cruickshank Stage 1/2 Dollar Academy (Number Eight)
 Karen Dunbar Stage 1/2 RHC Cougars
 Angus Fraser Stage 1/2 High School of Dundee
 George Goodenough Stage 1/2 Strathallan School (Stand-off)
 Caitlan Harvey Stage 1/2 Caithness RFC (Wing)
 Grant Hughes Stage 1/2 Dollar Academy
 Megan Kennedy Stage 1/2 Stirling County (Prop)
 Euan McLaren Stage 1/2 Dollar Academy
 Andrew McLean Stage 1/2 Stirling County
 Lucy Park Stage 1/2 Murrayfield Wanderers RFC (Openside flanker)
 Logan Trotter Stage 1/2 Stirling County
 Emma Wassell Stage 1/2 Murrayfield Wanderers RFC (Lock)

Edinburgh

 Ben Appleson Stage 1/2 Edinburgh Academicals (Full-back)
 Hamish Bain Stage 1/2 Currie RFC (Lock)
 Jack Bruce Stage 1/2 Edinburgh Academicals
 Ross Dunbar Stage 1/2 Stirling County (Prop)
 Calum Eastwood Stage 1/2 Watsonians
 Jordan Edmunds Stage 1/2 Boroughmuir RFC
 Ewan Fox Stage 1/2 High School of Dundee
 Fin Hobbis Stage 1/2 Stewarts Melville
 Jamie Hodgson Stage 1/2 Stewarts Melville
 Sarah Law Stage 1/2 Murrayfield Wanderers RFC (Scrum-half)
 Rhona Lloyd Stage 1/2 Edinburgh University
 Helen Nelson Stage 1/2 Murrayfield Wanderers RFC
 Dan Marek Stage 1/2 Currie RFC
 Lisa Martin Stage 1/2 Murrayfield Wanderers RFC
 Dean Roger Stage 1/2 Edinburgh Academicals
 Chloe Rollie Stage 1/2 Murrayfield Wanderers RFC
 Eilidh Sinclair Stage 1/2 Murrayfield Wanderers RFC (Wing)
 Lisa Thomson Stage 1/2 Edinburgh University
 Jamie Ure Stage 1/2 Boroughmuir RFC

Glasgow and the West

 Scott Bell Stage 1/2 Glasgow Hawks
 Paul Cairncross Stage 1/2 East Kilbride RFC (Hooker)
 Rachael Cook Stage 1/2 Murrayfield Wanderers RFC (Blindside flanker)
 Ben Eynon Stage 1/2 Glasgow Hawks
 Andrew Grant-Suttie Stage 1/2 Stirling County
 Fergus Haig Stage 1/2 GHA
 Josh Henderson Stage 1/2 Glasgow Hawks
 Martin Hughes Stage 1/2 Heriots (Blindside flanker)
 Ross Jackson Stage 1/2 Biggar RFC
 Andrew Jardine Stage 1/2 Biggar RFC
 Stafford McDowell Stage 1/2 Ayr RFC
 Louise McMillan Stage 1/2 Hillhead Jordanhill RFC
 Mark New Stage 1/2 Glasgow Hawks
 Craig Pringle Stage 1/2 Stirling County
 Robbie Smith Stage 1/2 Newton Stewart RFC (Hooker)
 Bruce Sorbie Stage 1/2 Stirling County
 Gavin Wilson Stage 1/2 Dumfries Saints
 Dan York Stage 1/2 West of Scotland

Graduates of this year 

Players who have signed professional contracts with clubs:

 Matt Smith to  Glasgow Warriors
 Lewis Wynne to  Glasgow Warriors
 Jamie Bhatti to  Glasgow Warriors
 Murray McCallum to  Edinburgh Rugby
 Ally Miller to  Edinburgh Rugby
 Darcy Graham to  Edinburgh Rugby
 George Horne to  Glasgow Warriors
 Patrick Kelly to  Glasgow Warriors
 Hugh Fraser to  Edinburgh Rugby
 Tom Galbraith to  Edinburgh Rugby
 Callum Hunter-Hill to  Edinburgh Rugby

References

2016-17
2016–17 in Scottish rugby union